Afshin ( / Afšīn) is a common Persian given name, which is a modern  Persian word derived from Avestan. Afshin was used by the Sogdians. Historically, it was the princely title of the rulers of Osrushana at the time of the Muslim conquest.  The Afshins of Osrushana were an Iranian principality in Central Asia of whom the later Abbasid general Khaydhar ibn Kawus al-Afshin is the most famous.

Etymology
Afšīn is the Arabicized form of the Middle Persian Pišīn, which traces back to the Avestan Pisinah. In pre-Islamic Iranian tradition, it is the name of a grandson of Kayānid king Kavād (Yt. 13.132, 19.71). In the Islamic period, it is found as a proper name attested by Armenian historians in the form Ōšin (from Awšin).

People
Historical
Khaydhar ibn Kawus al-Afshin (died 841), Abbasid general
Bishr al-Afshini, (died 918), Abbasid military commander  
Muhammad ibn Abi'l-Saj (died 901), Sājid ruler of Azerbaijan
Afshin Bey (disappeared 1077), Khorasani Turkmen commander of the Seljuk Empire

Given name
Afshin (singer), full name Afshin Jafari, Iranian pop star
Afshin Ellian (born 1966), Iranian-Dutch professor of law, philosopher, poet, and critic of political Islam
Afshin Esmaeilzadeh (born 1992), Iranian footballer 
Afshin Feiz, Iranian-born British photographer and ex fashion designer
Afshin Ghaffarian (born 1986), Iranian choreographer, director, dancer, and actor
Afshin Ghotbi (born 1964), Iranian football coach
Afshin Habibzadeh, Iranian workers' rights activist and reformist politician
Afshin Hajipour (born 1975), Iranian footballer 
Afshin Kamaei (born 1974), Iranian footballer
Afshin Kazemi (born 1986), Iranian futsal player
Afshin Moghaddam (1945–1976), Iranian singer
Afshin Mohebbi, Iranian-born United States businessman
Afshin Molavi, Iranian-American author and expert on global geo-political risk and geo-economics, particularly the Middle East and Asia
Afshin Naghouni (born 1969), Iranian-born British visual artist
Afshin Nazemi (born 1971), Iranian football player and coach 
Afshin Peyrovani (born 1970), Iranian footballer and a football coach
Afshin Norouzi (born 1985), Iranian table tennis player
Afshin Parsaeian Rad (born 1980), Iranian footballer 
Afshin Rattansi (born 1968), British broadcaster, journalist and author
Afshin Sadeghi (born 1993), Iranian handball player 
Afshin Zinouri (born 1976), Iranian voice actor who is known for Persian voice-dubbing foreign films and TV programs

Surname
Arash Afshin (born 1989), Iranian footballer
Nazanin Afshin-Jam (born 1979), Iranian-Canadian human rights activist, author

Places
Afşin, a town in the Kahramanmaraş Province in the Mediterranean region of Turkey

See also
Afsana (name)

Notes

References

Persian masculine given names
Iranian masculine given names